František Šembera (1 September 1904 – 3 August 1986) was a Czech equestrian. He competed for Czechoslovakia in the individual dressage event at the 1960 Summer Olympics.

References

External links
 
 

1904 births
1986 deaths
Czech male equestrians
Olympic equestrians of Czechoslovakia
Equestrians at the 1960 Summer Olympics
Sportspeople from České Budějovice